Erik Martin Österdahl (born 12 October 1973) is a Swedish television producer and author. From 2008 to 2014 he worked on broadcasts of Mästarnas mästare, Allt för Sverige and Skavlan for SVT. His first book, Be inte om nåd ("Ask no mercy"), was published in 2016. He is currently the European Broadcasting Union's Executive Supervisor of the Eurovision Song Contest.

Eurovision Song Contest 
In January 2020, it was announced by the European Broadcasting Union (EBU) that Österdahl would succeed Jon Ola Sand as the Executive Supervisor of the Eurovision Song Contest after the final of the  contest, which would have taken place in Rotterdam in May 2020. However, the 2020 contest was cancelled due to the COVID-19 pandemic; Österdahl later succeeded Sand as Executive Supervisor after the one-off replacement show, Eurovision: Europe Shine a Light was aired.

As Executive Supervisor, Österdahl has the last call with regards to the production of the Eurovision Song Contest, with the ability to overrule the producers, and instruct. He is also responsible for the organization of the voting system of the contest. He first made his debut as Executive Supervisor at the Junior Eurovision Song Contest 2020 in Warsaw, and later at the Eurovision Song Contest 2021 in Rotterdam. During his first years in the role, adaptations of the Eurovision format were announced for other continents, with the first such adaptation, American Song Contest, debuting in 2022.

Bibliography
2016 – Be inte om nåd ("Ask no mercy")
2017 – Tio svenskar måste dö ("Ten Swedes must die")
2018 – All business is show business: Spelregler för den kreativa eran
2019 – Järnänglar ("Iron angels")
2022 – Parmiddagen ("Couple dinner")

References

External links

1973 births
Living people
People from Sollentuna Municipality
Swedish writers
Melodifestivalen
Eurovision Song Contest people